Apollon Kalamarias B.C. is the basketball section of Apollon Kalamarias, the Greek multisport club based in Kalamaria, Thessaloniki. The women's team stands out from the club because has won two championships and one cup.

Women's team
The women's team of Apollon Kalamarias was founded in 1968, nine years after founding of men's team. It is the most successful section of Apollon since it is the only department that has won Panhellenic titles. It is also the only women's basketball team from Thessaloniki that has won a Greek championship or Greek cup. Apollon Kalamarias has won two championship and one cup. The current season the club plays in A2 Ethniki women's.

Recent seasons

Men's team
Men's team of Apollon kalamarias was founded in 1959, thanks to initiatives of Giorgos Meliadis. Apollon played for many years in Gamma Ethniki basketball. The most successful period of the club was the period 2009-2011 when Apollon played for three consecutive seasons in Beta Ethniki Basketball. The current season, Apollon played in Greek C Basket League.

Titles
Women's team
Greek Women's Basketball League
Winner (2): 1974, 1992
Greek Women's Basketball Cup
Winner (1): 1997

References

External links
 Official page

Basketball
Basketball teams in Thessaloniki
Women's basketball teams in Greece